Miralem Halilović  (born 22 July 1991) is a Bosnian professional basketball player for Nanterre 92 of the LNB Pro A and captain of the Bosnia and Herzegovina national basketball team. He plays at the power forward and center positions.

Career
Miralem grew up with Sloboda Dita and went on to spend four seasons playing for Zagreb.

After three months spent at Lithuanian Dzūkija at the beginning of the 2014–15 season, he briefly returned to Zagreb and signed a three-month contract with Krka-Telekom in March 2015.

In July 2015, he returned to KK Zagreb, signing a contract for one season. In August 2016, he signed with GKK Šibenik.

In June 2017, he signed with French club Orléans Loiret Basket of the LNB Pro B.

On April 27, 2020, he signed with Metropolitans 92 of the LNB Pro A.

On June 27, 2022, he signed with Nanterre 92 of the LNB Pro A.

References

External links
 Profile at aba-liga.com
 Profile at eurobasket.com
 Profile at fiba.com

Living people
1991 births
ABA League players
Bosnia and Herzegovina men's basketball players
Bosnia and Herzegovina Muslims
Centers (basketball)
GKK Šibenik players
KK Krka players
KK Sloboda Tuzla players
KK Zagreb players
Metropolitans 92 players
Nanterre 92 players
Orléans Loiret Basket players
Power forwards (basketball)
Sportspeople from Tuzla